Dallas Rugby Football Club is an American rugby team based in Dallas. The flagship team plays in the Red River Conference of the  USA Rugby Division I, with additional teams playing in USA Rugby Division II and USA Rugby Division III.

History
The club was founded in 1968. In 1978 they became the first Texas club to tour overseas when they toured England and Wales. Dallas RFC was also the first Texas rugby club to tour Australia in 1988. The side played matches in Sydney, Brisbane and the Sunshine Coast.

Notable former coaches
 Darren Morris

References

External links
Dallas RFC

Rugby clubs established in 1968
Sports teams in Dallas
Rugby union teams in Texas